Scheduled tribes of the Indian state of Odisha, as recognized by the Constitution of the Indian Republic; a total of 62 distinct tribes. The term "Scheduled Tribes" refers to specific indigenous peoples whose status is acknowledged to some formal degree by national legislation and unofficially referred as "tribals" or "adibasi" (Note that not all tribals or adibasis are considered as Scheduled Tribes). 13 out of these 62 Scheduled Tribes of Odisha are known as "Particularly Vulnerable Tribal Groups" (PVTGs). As per census 2011, the scheduled tribes of Odisha constitute more than 22.84% of the state's total population (95,90,756 totally) and 0.79% of the nation's total population.

Main tribes 

The Kondha or Kandha is the largest tribe of the state in terms of population. They have a population of about one million and are based mainly in the Kandhamal and adjoining districts namely Rayagada, Koraput, Balangir and Boudh. The Santals with a population over 800,000, inhabit the Mayurbhanj district. The Ho people with a population more than 100,000 inhabit in Mayurbhanj, Keonjhar, Jajpur, Balasore, Bhadrak, Sambalpur, Jharsuguda, Sonepur, Deogarh, Dhenkanal, Anugul, Jharsuguda, Sundergarh, Kandhamal district. The Saura, with a population over 300,000, are found mainly in the undivided Ganjam and Puri district. The Bonda, are known as 'the Naked People', and have a population of about 5,000 and live in Malkangiri district formerly part of undivided Koraput. The Kisans are the main residents of Sundergarh, Sambalpur and Keonjhar.

List of scheduled tribes
As per the Constitution (Scheduled Tribes) Order, 1950, the following were listed as Scheduled Tribes in Odisha

Bagata (Bhakta)
Baiga
Banjara (Banjari)
Bathudi (Bathuri)
Bhottada (Dhotada, Bhotra, Bhatra, Bhattara, Bhotora, Bhatara)
Bhuyan (Bhuinya)
Bhumia
Bhumij (Teli Bhumij, Haladipokhria Bhumij, Haladi Pokharia Bhumija, Desi Bhumij, Desia Bhumij, Tamaria Bhumij)
Bhunjia
Binjhal (Binjhwar)
Binjhia (Binjhoa)
Birhor (Mankidi, Mankirdia)
Bondo Poraja (Bonda Paroja, Banda Paroja)
Chenchu
Dal
Desua Bhumij
Dharua (Dhuruba, Dhurva)
Didayi (Didai Paroja, Didai)
Gadaba (Bodo Gadaba, Gutob Gadaba, Kapu Gadaba, Ollara Gadaba, Parenga Gadaba, Sano Gadaba]
Gandia
Ghara
Gond (Gondo, Rajgond, Maria Gond, Dhur Gond)
Ho
Holva
Jatapu
Juang
Kandha (Khond, Kond, Nanguli Kandha, Sitha Kandha, Kondh, Kui, Buda Kondh, Bura Kandha, Desia Kandha, Dungaria Kondh, Kutia Kandha, Kandha Gauda, Muli Kondh, Malua Kondh, Pengo Kandha, Raja Kondh, Raj Khond)
Kandha Gauda 
Kawar (Kanwar)
Kharia (Kharian, Berga Kharia, Dhelki Kharia, Dudh Kharia, Erenga Kharia, Munda Kharia, Oraon Kharia, Khadia, Pahari Kharia)
Kharwar
Kisan (Nagesar, Nagesia)
Kol
Kolah (Loharas, Kol Loharas)
Kolha (larka)
Koli (Malhar)
Kondadora
Kora
Korua
Kotia
Koya (Gumba Koya, Koitur Koya, Kamar Koya, Musara Koya)
Kulis (Kuli)
Lodha (Nodh, Nodha, Lodh)
Madia
Mahali
Mankidi
Mankirdia (Mankria, Mankidi)
Matya (Matia)
Mirdhas (Kuda, Koda, Mirdha)
Munda (Munda Lohara, Munda Mahalis, Nagabanshi Munda, Odia Munda)
Mundari
Omanatya (Omanatyo, Amanatya)
Oraon (Dhangar, Uran)
Parenga
Paroja (Parja, Bodo Paroja, Barong Jhodia Paroja, Chhelia Paroja, Jhodia Paroja, Konda Paroja, Paraja, Ponga Paroja, Sodia Paroja, Sano Paroja, Solia Paroja)
Pentia
Rajuar
Santal
Saora
Shabar Lodha
Sounti
Tharua (Tharua Bindhani)

List of Particularly Vulnerable Tribal Groups

 Birhor
 Bondo
 Chukutia Bhunjia
 Didayi
 Dangria Khond
 Juangas
 Kharias
 Kutia Kondh
 Lanjia Sauras
 Lodhas
 Mankidias
 Paudi Bhuyans
 Soura

Demographics 

(Note : PVTGs of Odisha are bold texted)

References

External links

Scheduled Tribes of India
Ethnic groups in Odisha
Social groups of Odisha